Big Bend is the name of some places in the U.S. state of Wisconsin:

Big Bend, Rusk County, Wisconsin, a town
Big Bend, Waukesha County, Wisconsin, a village

nl:Big Bend (Wisconsin)
pt:Big Bend (Wisconsin)